MOU, MoU, Mou or mou may refer to:

Places
 Mou, Burkina Faso, a town
 MOU Box, a fisheries management area in the Timor Sea
 Mou Forest, Burkina Faso
 Mou River, New Caledonia

People

As a surname
 Mou (surname), a Chinese surname
 Erica Mou (born 1990), Italian singer and musician
 Mou Zongsan (1909–1995), Chinese New Confucian philosopher

As a nickname
 José Mourinho, Portuguese football manager, nicknamed "Mou"

Other uses
Memorandum of understanding, MOU or MoU, a type of agreement between two or more parties
MOU, ISO 639 code for the Mogum language spoken in Chad
MoU, an abbreviation for Modern Ukrainian, the period of the Ukrainian language beginning at the very end of the 18th century
 Mou boots, footwear company
Mu (unit), a Chinese area unit also spelled mou, approximately 0.066 hectares.

See also